Bonnie L. Ladwig (December 11, 1939) is a Republican politician and legislator.

Born in Milwaukee, Wisconsin, Ladwig graduated from Shorewood High School. Ladwig served in the Wisconsin State Assembly from 1993 until 2005.

In the fall of 2002, Ladwig and other legislative leaders were ensnared in a caucus scandal. She was charged with one misdemeanor count for using Capitol staff to work on Republican campaigns. She pleaded guilty and was sentenced to 30 days in jail, served at home using electronic monitoring.

She is married to her predecessor in the Assembly, Jim Ladwig.  They have three children.  Their son, Jim, also served as a member of the Racine County Board of Supervisors.

Notes

Politicians from Milwaukee
Members of the Wisconsin State Assembly
Women state legislators in Wisconsin
1939 births
Living people
Wisconsin politicians convicted of crimes
21st-century American politicians
21st-century American women politicians
Shorewood High School (Wisconsin) alumni